69th ACE Eddie Awards
February 1, 2019

Feature Film (Dramatic): 
Bohemian Rhapsody

Feature Film (Comedy or Musical): 
The Favourite

The 69th American Cinema Editors Eddie Awards were presented on February 1, 2019 at the Beverly Hilton Hotel, honoring the best editors in films and television.

Winners and nominees
Winners will be listed first, highlighted in boldface.

Film
Best Edited Feature Film – Dramatic
 John Ottman – Bohemian Rhapsody
 Barry Alexander Brown – BlacKkKlansman
 Tom Cross – First Man
 Alfonso Cuarón and Adam Gough – Roma
 Jay Cassidy – A Star Is Born

Best Edited Feature Film – Comedy or Musical
 Yorgos Mavropsaridis – The Favourite
 Myron Kerstein – Crazy Rich Asians
 Craig Alpert, Elísabet Ronaldsdóttir and Dirk Westervelt – Deadpool 2
 Patrick J. Don Vito – Green Book
 Hank Corwin – Vice

Best Edited Animated Feature Film
 Robert Fisher Jr. – Spider-Man: Into the Spider-Verse
 Stephen Schaffer – Incredibles 2
 Andrew Weisblum, Ralph Foster and Edward Bursch – Isle of Dogs

Best Edited Documentary (Feature)
 Bob Eisenhardt – Free Solo
 Carla Gutierrez – RBG
 Michael Harte – Three Identical Strangers
 Jeff Malmberg and Aaron Wickenden – Won't You Be My Neighbor?

Best Edited Documentary (Non-Theatrical)
 Greg Finton and Poppy Das – Robin Williams: Come Inside My Mind
 Martin Singer – A Final Cut for Orson: 40 Years in the Making
 Neil Meiklejohn – Wild Wild Country, Part 3
 Joe Beshenkovsky – The Zen Diaries of Garry Shandling

Television
Best Edited Comedy Series for Commercial Television
 Kyle Reiter – Atlanta ("Teddy Perkins")
 Isaac Hagy – Atlanta ("Alligator Man")
 Eric Kissack – The Good Place ("Don't Let the Good Life Pass You By")
 Jordan Kim, Ali Greer, Heather Capps and Stacy Moon – Portlandia ("Rose Route")

Best Edited Comedy Series for Non-Commercial Television
 Kate Sanford – The Marvelous Mrs. Maisel ("Simone")
 Jeff Buchanan – Barry ("Make Your Mark")
 Nena Erb – Insecure ("Obsessed-Like")
 Tim Streeto – The Marvelous Mrs. Maisel ("We're Going to the Catskills!")

Best Edited Drama Series for Commercial Television
 Gary Dollner – Killing Eve ("Nice Face")
 Daniel Valverde – The Americans ("Start")
 Skip Macdonald – Better Call Saul ("Something Stupid")
 Chris McCaleb – Better Call Saul ("Winner")

Best Edited Drama Series for Non-Commercial Television
 Steve Singleton – Bodyguard ("Episode 1")
 Rosanne Tan – Homecoming ("Redwood")
 Cindy Mollo and Heather Goodwin Floyd – Ozark ("One Way Out")
 Andrew Seklir, Anna Hauger and Mako Kamitsuna – Westworld ("The Passenger")

Best Edited Miniseries or Motion Picture for Television
 Malcolm Jamieson and Geoffrey Richman – Escape at Dannemora ("Better Days")
 Emily Greene – The Assassination of Gianni Versace: American Crime Story ("A Random Killing")
 Veronique Barbe, Dominique Champagne, Justin Lachance, Maxime Lahaie, Émile Vallée and Jai M. Vee – Sharp Objects ("Milk")

Best Edited Non-Scripted Series
 Hunter Gross – Anthony Bourdain: Parts Unknown ("West Virginia")
 Rob Butler – Deadliest Catch ("Storm Surge")
 Molly Shock and Jnani Butler – Naked and Afraid'' ("Fire and Fury")

References

External links

69
2018 film awards
2018 guild awards
2018 in American cinema